Piquet Racing was a short-lived British Formula 3000 racing team set up in 1992 by Brazilian Formula One world champion Nelson Piquet and Nigel Stepney.

The team entered a single car for Olivier Beretta, a young Monegasque friend of Piquet, in the 1992 Formula 3000 season. The season was without much success, though, as Beretta failed to score any points, and third on the grid at the Spa-Francorchamps round was the highlight of the season. The team did not return for 1993.

Complete Formula 3000 results 
(key) (Races in bold indicate pole position; races in italics indicate fastest lap)

References

British auto racing teams
International Formula 3000 teams
Piquet Racing

Auto racing teams established in 1992
Auto racing teams disestablished in 1992